Microseridinae is a subtribe of Cichorieae in the sunflower family Asteraceae.

Microseridinae genera recognized by the Global Compositae Database as of June 2022:

 Agoseris
 Anisocoma
 Atrichoseris
 Calycoseris
 Chaetadelpha
 Glyptopleura
 Krigia
 Lygodesmia
 Malacothrix
 Marshalljohnstonia
 Microseris
 Munzothamnus
 Nothocalais
 Picrosia
 Pinaropappus
 Pleiacanthus
 Prenanthella
 Pyrrhopappus
 Rafinesquia
 Shinnersoseris
 Stephanomeria
 Uropappus

References

Cichorieae
Plant subtribes